Sainte-Marie-de-Ré (literally Saint Mary of Ré) is a commune in the Charente-Maritime department in southwestern France.

Geography

Sainte-Marie-de-Ré is a small village, on the southern coast of the Île de Ré, facing the  Île d'Oléron.

The coastal part is bordered by beaches and small cliffs.

History
Sainte-Marie (as a word) was first used as a designation for a Parish Church in the late 12th century.  The village centered on grape farming for over a millennium and maintains a strong rural identity. The commune was officially begun in 1790.

Population
Inhabitants of Sainte-Marie-de-Ré: Maritais.
Inhabitants of La Noue: Nouais.

Economy
 Agriculture: grape vineyards, asparagus, potatoes.
 Tourism.
 Thalassotherapy:  The thalassotherapy center on the waterfront of the south-eastern edge of Sainte-Marie was expanded in 2004.
 Computer information technology.

Sights

Religious sites
The Parish church, Notre-Dame-de-l'Assomption at Sainte-Marie de Ré whose existence was first recorded in the late 12th century.  In 1467 the church was fortified and a moat surrounding the church was dug.
The Saint Sauveur Chapel at La Noue.

Civil sites
A Monument to the Dead.
A monument by sculptor Mélanie Quentin called "La Connaissance" which was installed in 2006.
The Magayant house, a fishing museum.

International relations
The commune is twinned with:
 Pierrefort

See also
Communes of the Charente-Maritime department

References

Communes of Charente-Maritime
Île de Ré
Charente-Maritime communes articles needing translation from French Wikipedia
Populated coastal places in France